The Tam-Tams is the informal name of a weekly free festival around the George-Étienne Cartier Monument in Mount Royal Park in Montreal, Quebec, Canada. Its name imitates the sound of drums and refers to the drum circles that form the focal points of the gathering.

Events

Thousands of drum players, dancers, vendors and visitors come together every Sunday afternoon throughout the temperate months, occupying much of the open space on the eastern edge of Mount Royal Park. Jeanne-Mance Park (also known as Fletcher's Field), located directly across Avenue du Parc from where the Tam-Tams take place, serves as the city's main outdoor sporting ground. As such, the entire area is generally quite popular on Sundays in the summertime, drawing an exceptionally diverse crowd to myriad activities. The Tam-Tams typically start around 10:30am and continue until sunset. It is not an officially sanctioned nor sponsored event, simply a regular if technically spontaneous event. As such, it is difficult to pinpoint when it started or what motivated the first drum circle.

History

Spending Sundays in Mount Royal Park has been popular since the park was inaugurated in 1876, and the nature and design of Fletcher's Field has always made it a popular spot for picnics and sunbathers. Musical performances have been a staple since time immemorial, as brass bands, military and marching bands were popular entertainment until around the time of the Second World War. Moreover, the location of the Tam-Tams isn't too far from where Montreal's first permanent exposition hall, the Crystal Palace, was located. As such the location of the Tam-Tams is well rooted in the history of Montreal public life and festivities.

Anecdotal evidence suggests the first people to begin regular drumming at the base of the Cartier monument back in the mid-1960s. A group of students from the West Indies who lived in the area arranged to meet at the monument and practice in a public place to avoid disturbing their neighbours.

However, alternate anecdotal evidence suggests more recent beginnings. Quoted from an Ottawa-based musician and educator: 
"...1992, it started with four ceremonial guard guys (me included) meeting up to buy pot from some guys we met at Steve's music store. They were buying djembes and we had just attended a clinic with Memo Ascevedo, and bought traditional go-go bells, tambime (not tambourine), clave, talking drum, etc. He had a Cuban buddy who played bongos, and we met at the statue to exchange rhythmic ideas. We shared an apartment on l'esplanade with 6 other army guys, all drummers. 3 of us were on leave at alternate times, 6 days of work, 3 days off. So there was always someone at the house. We agreed to meet every Sunday at the park, get high, and jam. Other guys started coming, it watered down the quality of the jam, but it got bigger and bigger..."

But it would be many years before the Tam-Tams became an element of the Montreal counter-culture scene. In this respect, anecdotal evidence suggests the Tam-Tams' origins date back to Saint Jean Baptiste Day 1976 when the City of Montreal located festivities related to the day entirely within the 'mountain domain'. In this case the mountain became a playground for the city's youth and counter-culture, with music throughout the day and many bonfires throughout the night. Damage to the park was so extreme the city would never again use the mountain for large-scale organized festivities.

Present day

Today's Tam-Tams are still centred on the drum circle, but have evolved to also include artisanal vendors, DJs, performance artists, exhibitionists and a battle-royal for fantasy role players.

Because of the 'laissez-faire' attitude that characterizes the festivities, drug dealing, drug use and public drinking are tolerated to a degree. The Tam-Tams is strongly associated with cannabis culture, and though Montreal police are generally present they tend to disregard consumption of alcohol and cannabis. The general rule observed by Montrealers and respected by the police is discretion, moderation and not consuming in view of children.

See also 
 Drum circle
 Hand drum

References

External links

Online documentary Tam Tam Montreal: Sunday in the Park, CITIZENShift
 Tam Tams! – A short film

1978 establishments in Quebec
Drumming
Mount Royal
Music of Montreal